History Colorado is a historical society that was established in 1879 as the State Historical Society of Colorado, also known as the Colorado Historical Society. History Colorado is a 501(c)(3) organization and an agency of the State of Colorado under the Department of Higher Education.

Overview 
History Colorado offers the public access to cultural and heritage resources of Colorado, including museums and special programs for individuals and families, collection stewardship of Colorado's historic treasures, educational resources for schools, students and teachers, services related to preservation, archaeology and history, and the Stephen H. Hart Research Library.

History Colorado's statewide activities support tourism, historic preservation, education, and research related to Colorado's rich western history, offering the public unique opportunities to interact with Colorado history through its network of museums, which offer both exhibitions and special programs for adults and children.

History Colorado also works with schools across Colorado to provide classrooms and teachers with resources and curriculum related to Colorado history, and offers local communities resources that help them to enrich historical-related community-based programs.

History Colorado publishes the quarterly magazine Colorado Heritage (formerly The Colorado Magazine).

The History Colorado Center 
In 2012, the agency opened the new state history museum of Colorado, the History Colorado Center. As History Colorado's headquarters, the History Colorado Center is designed to be a tourist destination, a museum, as well as a center for civic programs and discussion. The building houses core and traveling exhibitions, education/public programs, the Office of Archaeology and Historic Preservation, the State Historical Fund, the Stephen H. Hart Research Library, and other History Colorado functions. Located at 12th and Broadway in Denver's Golden Triangle Museum District, this is a building that was designed and constructed by an all-Colorado team: Tryba Architects, Trammell Crow Company and Hensel Phelps Construction Company. History Colorado is a Smithsonian Affiliate. At the building's April 2012 opening ceremony, Smithsonian Affiliations Director Harold Closter described the History Colorado Center as "the first great history museum of the twenty-first century."

Preservation programs 
History Colorado has cared for the historic treasures of the state for more than 130 years and has directed over a quarter of a billion dollars in grants for statewide preservation and education to all regions of the state. Through the State Historical Fund historic preservation grants program, History Colorado has awarded millions in competitive grants to all 64 counties across Colorado. As the State Historic Preservation Office, the Office of Archaeology and Historic Preservation handles the processing and documenting of statewide archaeological and historic preservation-related projects. Through its various offices, programs, and services, History Colorado exerts a significant economic, cultural and civic impact and continues as a vital entity to the progress and development of Colorado.

The Office of Archaeology and Historic Preservation (OAHP) oversees a number of program areas: 
 The Colorado State Register of Historic Properties
 The State Historical Fund. The fund was created in 1990 through a state constitutional amendment allowing limited gaming in the towns of Black Hawk, Central City, and Cripple Creek. A proportion of the tax revenues from gaming is used for historic preservation in Colorado.  Applications for projects for potential funding are assessed through a competitive process.

History 
The State Historical Society of Colorado was founded in 1879 and currently owns and maintains thirteen historic sites and museums at ten locations around the state. It is both a nonprofit agency and a part of the state department of higher education. The Colorado Historical Society is an affiliate within the Smithsonian Affiliations program  and is accredited by the American Alliance of Museums. The central offices of History Colorado are based in Denver.

Historic sites and museums
History Colorado administers the following historic sites and museums:
 History Colorado Center, Denver
 Byers-Evans House Museum, Denver
 El Pueblo History Museum, Pueblo
 Fort Garland Museum and Pike's Stockade, Fort Garland
 Fort Vasquez Museum, Platteville
 Georgetown Loop Historic Mining & Railroad Park, Georgetown
 Grant-Humphreys Mansion, Denver
 Healy House Museum and Dexter Cabin, Leadville
 Trinidad History Museum, Trinidad
 Ute Indian Museum, Montrose

Centennial Farms and Ranches
History Colorado provides designations of centennial farms and centennial ranches that have been in one family for more than 100 years.  For example, Salt Works Ranch in Park County.

See also
 Colorado 1870-2000
 History of Colorado
 Pony Express Bible

References

External links
 History Colorado website
 History Colorado Center website
 Office of Archaeology & Historic Preservation and State Historical Fund website

 
State historical societies of the United States
Organizations established in 1879
Non-profit organizations based in Colorado
Organizations based in Denver
History of Colorado
Historical societies in Colorado
Smithsonian Institution affiliates
Institutions accredited by the American Alliance of Museums
1879 establishments in Colorado